Retro Hit Radio is a radio station based in Auckland, New Zealand. Retro Hit Radio has a diverse music playlist predominantly from the 1980s and 1990s. The station broadcast on FM for the first six years, and is now an internet radio station.

History
Retro Hit Radio was developed as an idea in 1996, when the building of the music library began. It began trial broadcasts in 2001, then started broadcasting on Waitangi Day, February 2004 on the frequency 106.9 FM in Otahuhu, and continued until a frequency change to 88.1 FM after securing a broadcast site at Goodwood Heights in November of that year, and began broadcasting to Manukau City.

On 1 October 2007, the 88.1 transmission in Manukau was switched off, and relocated to Kohimarama on the same frequency, where it was broadcasting until 10 February 2008.

The station then became a dedicated internet radio station based in Grey Lynn and streamed until 25 April 2010.

2013 Relaunch
After a few years, the social media accounts of Retro Hit Radio became active a few months prior to the relaunch, which was announced on 1 December 2013 to occur at 10am on 11 December 2013. The date was chosen given it would align at a sequential time at 10am on the 11th day of the 12th month of the 13th year. The first song played for the re-launch was Escapade by Janet Jackson.

Format and Branding
Retro Hit Radio enjoys a diverse music playlist centered around the 1980s and 1990s. The music heard is mostly upbeat, and plays a genre-crossing mix of CHR music of the time, including pop, rock, soul, dance and early electronic, old school hip hop, power ballads, post-punk, alt-pop, new wave, grunge, college rock, brit-pop, indie, disco, post-disco and breakdance. Whilst this marks a similarity toward being a Jack format, the span of decades is less broad and measurably more hits-based in comparison.

The music library and music playlists reflect what was played on New Zealand, Australian, United Kingdom, and American radio stations of the era, and are key to the library of 'hits'. Promotional radio edits were sourced and used for broadcast, to present an accurate re-creation of the era. The energy and presentation of the station was loosely modeled on that of the then top rating Auckland radio stations Radio Hauraki, 89FM and Magic 91FM circa 1985 - 1992.

The radio station is identified in stream by a mix of short produced audio elements. There are also jingles, sung by Auckland-based singer Charene Clarke. Retro Hit Radio also brands itself by employing a corporate voice. Phil Braithwaite (Counties-Manukau Radio/Times FM) was the original corporate voice from 2004 to mid-2006, and Dan Bernstone (ZM Network/More FM) from 2006 onward.

Broadcast license and coverage
Retro Hit Radio originally broadcast in stereo on 88.1 FM, which is one of 16 New Zealand Government licensed LPFM frequencies (GURL) available only in New Zealand. At the time, broadcast power was restricted to 300 mW EIRP. The Goodwood Heights broadcast site for Retro Hit Radio was elevated at 140m above sea level at Goodwood Heights (near Manukau), and provided a radius of approx 8–12 km of coverage in any direction. Later, the broadcast power increased to 500 mW EIRP marginally strengthening the FM signal rather than increasing its range. This is due to the flat local geography and well-serviced transmission equipment - including a PLL PRO III 4W NRG transmitter and J-pole antenna. The Kohimarama transmission was from Rawhitiroa Road which overlooks Kohimarama and St Heliers.

Internet Streaming
The original stream used the aacPlus format, in stereo at 32kbit/s. Since the re-launch, Retro Hit Radio has been streaming at 128kbps mp3 stereo. This was later changed and is currently 128kbps AAC stereo.

Retro Hit Radio was an early adopter of mobile streaming. FStream which was an iOS app that made it possible to listen to the aacPlus stream with an iPhone. You could also listen online with a regular mobile phone through the Moodio directory. Tuner 2, now known as TuneIn is one of the many directories where Retro Hit Radio can be streamed.

Lineup
The original weekday lineup consisted of Mark Smith (6-10am), and Richard Phelps (10-5pm). Previous announcers included David Gray, Greg Prebble, and Aidan Tavendale. Currently the station is announcer-free except for occasional programming features, or general recorded notices.

Programming features

Regular Features
Daily, or regular features included the popular podcast Stuck In The 80's, hosted by Steve Spears, The Hot 9 at 9, The 80s Lunch, e-Quest Afternoons, Chips Dips & Dorks, and the 90s at Night.

Saturday broadcast features include Hotmix with DJ Fresh (Fri from 10 pm – Sat 4 am), Partymix each Saturday (5-10pm)

Sunday broadcast features include Hotmix with DJ Fresh (10 pm Sat – 4 am Sun) and Guilty Pleasures (2006–current) (9–10 pm)

Previous features no longer broadcast include
 Long Player (6-7pm Saturdays) (2004-2021)
 Retro Rave (7-10pm Saturdays) (2004-2021)
 Retro Now! (6-7pm Sundays) (2004-2021)
 Beyond Yacht Rock (6-9am Sundays) (Dec 31, 2017 - Sept 16, 2018)
 The Boombox: Breakdance and Hip Hop Classics (7-9pm) (2013-2016)
 The Breakdown: Breakdance (7–8pm Sundays) (2004–2009)
 The Breakdown: Disco Classics (8–9pm Sundays) (2004–2009)
 Front Row Live! (9–10 pm Sundays) (2004–2006)
 Late N Loud (10pm-12mn Sundays) (2013-2016)
 Sunday Crush (10pm–12mn Sundays) (2004–2009)

Specialty Programming

Retro Hit Radio has a number of pre-recorded programming features, including "Guilty Pleasures", "Every Single Ever Released" and "The Top 100 #1 Hits of the 1980s" and are often repeated in full.

Guilty Pleasures
Guilty Pleasures is a series of hour long shows hosted by Richard Phelps and guests, each Sunday night showcasing "lost music" of the era, and attends to obscure listener requests.

Every Single Ever Released
Every Single Ever Released is the hallmark feature produced and hosted by Richard Phelps that is typically played during summer, or as a promotional tool to direct attention to an upcoming tour or album release from a core artist that was frequently played. Each show is presented as a musical documentary that follows the timeline of the artist or band, as each single was released throughout their career. These shows vary in duration, with the longest (profiling U2) at just over 4 hours. Each show grows in length, as each artist releases new material. For example, with the February 2008 release of Thriller 25 by Michael Jackson, the two remix singles The Girl Is Mine and Wanna Be Startin' Somethin were added to the list. This show was repeated in full for the release of MJ50 on 29 August 2008. Each New Zealand summer, Every Single Ever Released is presented as a summer series, during the new year holiday break, which may include any mix of previous shows and/or new shows. Artists profiled through Every Single Ever Released have so far included Madonna, Michael Jackson, Simply Red, U2, INXS, Janet Jackson, Eurythmics, Bon Jovi, George Michael, Duran Duran, The Cure, Def Leppard, Cheap Trick, John Mellencamp, Kylie Minogue, The B52's, Red Hot Chili Peppers and Bruce Springsteen. Some or all of these shows are repeated over the New Zealand summer holidays.

Other Features
"The Top 100 Retro Covers Countdown" was the final feature show broadcast on Sunday 18 April 2010 which was just 8 days before the 2010 station closure. The 100 songs were subject to research analysis coupled with audience votes via the Polldaddy website and the Facebook Group set up for the feature. The show lasted 10.5 hours in its entirety, which was by far the longest running feature that had ever been broadcast on the station.

The Top 100 #1 Hits of the 1980s was an exclusive 4-hour show hosted by Mark Smith, and was produced in October and November 2005. This show was presented in the style of an end of year featurette, with iconic audio clips of the era, and in-depth detail of the music, and how the culture and headlines were received in New Zealand during the 1980s.

The methodology behind the show's title and the music included, was based on music research and reflects New Zealand year-end charts between 1980 and 1989. With this basis, a simple week by week points system determined song positions. A lot of New Zealand and Australian artists were included in this list of 100 singles, as a result of the localism of the music during this era.

"The Top 100 Retro Reggae Tracks" was first aired on 17 February 2008 and remains as a scheduled yearly event on the second to last Sunday of every February. This feature is compiled by audience vote, via a polling system through Polldaddy.

"The Great Kiwiana Bash" is a music feature broadcast every year on 6 February, since 2008. Only New Zealand music of the 80s and 90s is played throughout the day, to celebrate the national holiday Waitangi Day. While a 24-hour New Zealand music station once existed, this feature is particularly notable as New Zealand-made music in the 80s and 90s received very little radio airplay at the time. This feature showcased the abundance of single releases available at the time.

"The Great ANZAC Bash" is a music feature that commemorates Anzac Day, and is subsequently broadcast on 25 April every year. The musical content is similar to The Great Kiwiana Bash (above), by featuring New Zealand made music of the 80s and 90s, but also including Australian-made music of the same musical period, as a gesture pointing to the ANZAC ties between the two countries.

"The Top 10 Native Retro Hits" was a featurette that showcased ten songs that were sung entirely in a mother tongue. In other words, the songs were not in the English language. The order of these songs was determined by vote however the list of songs was nominated by music research. Shortly after the broadcast of the show, an edited podcast was available for download from the website for a limited time.

"Summer Sailin'" is a 12 episode series of Yacht_Rock music, each episode is 1 hour long. Summer Sailin' is only aired during the NZ summer months of December, January and February. In the summers of 2020/21 and 2021/22 an episode would be aired each Sunday, first at 6am and replayed at 6pm. As Auckland is known as the "City Of Sails", sailing to Yacht Rock music is the theme of the show and the music closely follows the Yachtski scale noted on the 'Beyond Yacht Rock' Podcast that the station once aired.

References

External links
 Facebook Page
 Twitter Page

Radio stations in Auckland